Langhorne Creek Football Club is an Australian rules football club based in Langhorne Creek, South Australia that currently competes in the Great Southern Football League. The club plays its home games at Langhorne Creek Memorial Park which is located at Murray Road, Langhorne Creek.

History 
The Langhorne Creek Football Club's first recorded match was against Milang in 1906 and during those early years would play one-off matches against teams from neighbouring towns. The club began playing more official matches when it joined the Alexandra Football Association in 1922 however this competition disbanded in 1924. Langhorne Creek joined the B Grade competition of the Hills Central Football Association in 1932 and lost the grand final to Milang in this first season before winning the club's first premiership the following season, once again against Milang. Langhorne Creek joined the Hills Football League when it was established in 1967. For the majority of the club's time competing in the HFL, they were known as the Tigers and wore black and gold. After winning three consecutive A Grade premierships in the Hills Football League between 1975 and 1977, the club joined the Great Southern Football League and became the Hawks. The switch to the GSFL saw the club enjoy immediate success, winning the 1978 GSFL grand final to make it four premierships in a row. The club endured a 23-year premiership drought until they achieved success once again in 2001. Since that time, Langhorne Creek have won seven premierships. They were back-to-back premiers in 2001/2002, 2011/2012 and most recently a three-peat in 2018/2019/2020.

Premierships 
A Grade - 1933, 1948, 1949, 1951, 1960, 1962, 1975, 1976, 1977, 1978, 2001, 2002, 2011, 2012, 2018, 2019, 2020

Reserve Grade - 1976, 1998, 2006, 2020

Senior Colts - 1962, 1972, 1975, 1986, 1987, 2000, 2001, 2005

Junior Colts - 1973, 1974, 1975, 2016

Mini Colts - 1978, 1994, 2006

Mail Medallists 
A Grade

1950 - Ian Dodd

1951 - Leo Hayes

1962 - Ken Follett

1964 - Ken Follett

1983 - Dennis Elliott

1988 - Kym Warren

2000 - Luen Credlin

2001 - Brett Heinrich

2006 - Randall Follett

2008 - Randall Follett

2009 - Ben Moore

Reserve Grade

1976 - Trevor Hull

1993 - Geoff Warren

1994 - Mark Chandler

1995 - Mike Perrey

1996 - Darren Hull

2000 - Rob Clark

2005 - Tim Footner

2007 - Jake Miller

2008 - Ant Tonkin

2009 - Rory Nixon

2015 - Rob Lyon

Senior Colts

1962 - Bill Tonkin

1969 - Ian Tonkin

1970 - Geoff Warren

1980 - Robbie Potts

1986 - Phil Chandler

1988 - John O'Driscoll

1992 - Craig Scutchings

1994 - Russell Scutchings

2015 - Jedd Rothe

2020 - Mitchell Felton

Junior Colts

1980 - Grantley Hull

2002 - Felipe Hill

2017 - Matthew Roberts

Honour Roll

Most Senior Games

Leading A Grade Goal Kickers

Life Members

Notable former players 
Matt Roberts became the first Langhorne Creek player to be drafted to the AFL when he was selected by the Sydney Swans with pick 34 in the 2021 AFL draft.  He made his AFL debut for the Swans on 27 May 2022 in their Round 11 match against Richmond at the SCG. Matt was a talented junior player for Langhorne Creek and played in the club's 2018 GSFL A Grade Grand Final win at just 15 years of age.   

Paralympian and world record holder Michael Roeger played junior football for Langhorne Creek from the late 1990s through to 2005. His final match for the club before leaving the game to focus on athletics was the 2005 Senior Colts grand final win. Despite living in Canberra where he has a scholarship with the Australian Institute of Sport, Roeger remains a passionate supporter of the Hawks. 

Grant Bartholamaeus started his junior football for Langhorne Creek before his family moved to Forbes, NSW when he was 12 years old. He later went on to play VFL football for the Sydney Swans. He played 4 league matches for the Swans from 1986 to 1987.

Ben Warren played junior football for Langhorne Creek from the late 1980s through to 1999 before a season of A Grade football for the Hawks in 2000. He joined South Adelaide Football Club in 2001 and went on to play 163 league games for the Panthers and kick 345 goals from 2001 to 2010. Warren returned to Langhorne Creek in 2011 to captain the Hawks to an A Grade premiership. In 2012 he joined Norwood Football Club and played two seasons for the Redlegs and won back-to-back SANFL premierships before announcing his retirement. He was appointed coach of Norwood ahead of the 2014 season and guided the Redlegs to their third straight premiership in his debut season as coach. Warren remained coach until the end of the 2016 season. Following his time at Norwood, Warren returned to Langhorne Creek as a player and was a member of the 2018 premiership team.

References

 Australian rules football clubs in South Australia
1906 establishments in Australia
Australian rules football clubs established in 1906